Larsen Alan Jensen (born September 1, 1985) is an American former competition swimmer and a two-time Olympic medalist.

Career

At the 2003 World Championships, Jensen earned a silver medal in the 800-meter freestyle, his first medal at the international level.

He competed in the 2004 Summer Olympics, winning silver in the 1,500-meter freestyle race, as well as competing in the 400-meter freestyle, where he finished fourth. At the 2005 World Aquatics Championships, he won silver medals in the 800 and 1,500-meter freestyle races.

Jensen completed his degree in political science with a minor in business at the University of Southern California in 2007. 

Jensen competed in the 2008 Summer Olympics in Beijing, where he won the bronze medal in the 400-meter freestyle, and also placed fifth in the 1,500-meter freestyle.

Jensen is the current American record holder in the 400-meter freestyle and former American record holder in the 1,500-meter freestyle.

After Larsen Jensen's career in swimming, he took a career in the military enlisting in the United States Navy and becoming a Navy SEAL from 2009 to 2015.

Following his retirement from the military, Larsen enrolled into Stanford Graduate School of Business and obtained a MBA.

Personal bests (long course)

See also
 List of Olympic medalists in swimming (men)
 List of University of Southern California people
 List of World Aquatics Championships medalists in swimming (men)

References

External links
 
 
 
 
 

1985 births
Living people
American male freestyle swimmers
American people of Danish descent
Olympic bronze medalists for the United States in swimming
Olympic silver medalists for the United States in swimming
Sportspeople from Bakersfield, California
Swimmers at the 2004 Summer Olympics
Swimmers at the 2008 Summer Olympics
USC Trojans men's swimmers
World Aquatics Championships medalists in swimming
Medalists at the FINA World Swimming Championships (25 m)
Medalists at the 2008 Summer Olympics
Medalists at the 2004 Summer Olympics
20th-century American people
21st-century American people